Thyrosticta sylvicolens is a moth of the subfamily Arctiinae first described by Arthur Gardiner Butler in 1878. It is native to Madagascar.

This species has a wingspan of 40–42 mm.

References

External links
"Thyrosticta sylvicolens (Butler, 1878)". African Moths. Retrieved November 16, 2019.

Arctiinae
Moths of Madagascar
Moths of Africa